Daniel Paul Ahlers is an American businessman and politician who was the Democratic nominee for U.S. Senate in South Dakota in the 2020 election, which he lost to Republican incumbent Mike Rounds. Ahlers was a Democratic member of the South Dakota House of Representatives (2006–08 and 2017–19) and of the South Dakota Senate (2008–10), representing District 25, which encompasses Dell Rapids and areas north and northeast of Sioux Falls.

Early life, education, and business career 
Daniel "Dan" Paul Ahlers was born in Dell Rapids, South Dakota, on November 14, 1973. His family moved to Rapid City and Gillette, Wyoming, before returning to Dell Rapids when he was in high school. He graduated from Dell Rapids High School, where he participated in concert and jazz band, newspaper, basketball, and cross country. Ahlers was an assistant manager at Menards from 1992 to 2001. He graduated from Augustana University in Sioux Falls in 1997 with a Bachelor's of Arts in government and international affairs.

In 1999, Ahlers opened Video Plus, a video rental store in Dell Rapids. He also opened Video Plus stores in Hartford, South Dakota and Tea, South Dakota, selling both in 2005. The Dell Rapids Video Plus closed in 2019. Ahlers has been a substitute teacher in the Dell Rapids School District. He also owned Jabberwock Coffee House from 2008 to 2011.

Ahlers has served community organizations as a Kids Voting South Dakota board member, a Carroll Institute board member, president of the Haven before & after school program, and president of the Dell Rapids Community Fund.

As of June 2020, Ahlers is president and interim administrator of the Dell Rapids Chamber of Commerce.

South Dakota State Legislature 
Ahlers served in the South Dakota House of Representatives in 2007–08, in the state senate in 2009–10, and again in state house in 2017–18. He narrowly lost his 2018 reelection bid, receiving 101 fewer votes than Republican Tom Pischke to represent the district in 2019–20.

U.S. Senate campaign 
On September 24, 2019, Ahlers filed a Statement of Organization to form a committee to run for the U.S. Senate in South Dakota.

Ahlers was the Democratic nominee for U.S. Senate in South Dakota in the 2020 election, which he lost to Republican incumbent Mike Rounds.

Personal life 
Ahlers is married to Amy. They have two children.

References

External links
South Dakota Legislature - Dan Ahlers government website
Campaign website

Follow the Money - Dan Ahlers
2008 2006 campaign contributions

|-

|-

|-

1973 births
Living people
Democratic Party members of the South Dakota House of Representatives
People from Dell Rapids, South Dakota
Augustana University alumni
21st-century American politicians
Candidates in the 2020 United States Senate elections